Sos Suhana (born 4 April 1992 in Phnom Penh, Cambodia) is a footballer for Nagaworld in the Cambodian League. He plays as a midfielder.

Phnom Penh Crown
After the relegation of Prek Pra Keila in 2011, Suhana has signed for Phnom Penh Crown. In 2012, he was in the squad in play in 2012 AFC President's Cup. He helped his club to win Cambodian League in the 2014 season and helped his club to be the third place in 2014 Mekong Club Championship too.

Nagaworld
In 2016, Suhana signed a contract with Nagaworld after spending 5 years with Phnom Penh Crown.

International career
After impressed national team's coach while he was playing for Prek Pra Keila, Suhana was called up for his national team to play against Laos in 2014 FIFA World Cup qualification – AFC First Round. He made his international debut in a Friendly Match against Philippines on 5 September 2012, which ended in a scoreless draw. However, it was not a FIFA full 'A' international friendly since the Cambodian side used seven substitutes instead of six. He scored his first international goal in 2018 FIFA World Cup qualification – AFC Second Round against Singapore in the 65th minute. On 23 November 2016, he scored a goal against Myanmar during 2016 AFF Championship.

International goals

Honours

Phnom Penh Crown
Cambodian League: 2014

References 

1992 births
Living people
Cambodian footballers
Cambodia international footballers
Sportspeople from Phnom Penh
Association football midfielders
Phnom Penh Crown FC players
Nagaworld FC players